Florencia Szigeti (born July 8, 1981) is a female freestyle swimmer from Argentina. She twice competed for her native country at the Summer Olympics (2000 and 2004), and won a silver medal in the women's 100 m freestyle event at the 2003 Pan American Games.

See also
 List of Argentine records in swimming

References

thesundevils profile

1981 births
Living people
Argentine female freestyle swimmers
Argentine female swimmers
Arizona State Sun Devils women's swimmers
Olympic swimmers of Argentina
Swimmers at the 2000 Summer Olympics
Swimmers at the 2004 Summer Olympics
Swimmers at the 1999 Pan American Games
Swimmers at the 2003 Pan American Games
Swimmers from Buenos Aires
Pan American Games silver medalists for Argentina
Pan American Games medalists in swimming
Medalists at the 2003 Pan American Games
21st-century Argentine women